Polish Republic is the official name of Poland. It may also refer to:

 The First Polish Republic, applied in hindsight to the Polish–Lithuanian Commonwealth (1569–1795)
 Second Polish Republic (1918–1939)
 Polish People's Republic (1947-1989)
 Third Polish Republic (since 1989)

See also 
 Rzeczpospolita
 Rzeczpospolita (disambiguation)
 Rzeczpospolita Polska (disambiguation)